Abi Defa Marendra (born 5 November 1999) is an Indonesian professional footballer who plays as a central midfielder for Liga 1 club Dewa United.

Club career

Dewa United
Abi Defa was signed for Dewa United to play in Liga 2 for the 2021–22 season.

Career statistics

Club

Notes

References

External links
 Abi Defa Marendra at Soccerway
 Abi Defa Marendra at Liga Indonesia

1999 births
Living people
People from Surakarta
Sportspeople from Central Java
Liga 1 (Indonesia) players
Liga 2 (Indonesia) players
Dewa United F.C. players
Indonesian footballers
Association football midfielders